Senator Faulk may refer to:

Larry Faulk (born 1936), Washington State Senate
Mike Faulk (1953–2014), Tennessee State Senate